Hydnellum cyanodon is a rare species of tooth fungus in the family Bankeraceae. Found in Boularderie Island and Antigonish County (Nova Scotia, Canada), it was described as new to science in 1964 by Canadian mycologist Kenneth A. Harrison. The turbinate (cushion-shaped) cap of the fruitbody measures  in diameter. Spines on the cap underside up to 5 mm long, and blue in color. The fungus fruits singly or in groups in deep moss under spruce trees.

References

External links

Fungi described in 1964
Fungi of North America
Inedible fungi
cyanodon